Ankiririsa is a coastal fishing village on the southwest coast of Madagascar. It is connected by road to Anakao in the north. To the southeast is the Lake Tsimanampetsotsa and Tsimanampetsotsa National Park.

References

Populated coastal places in Madagascar
Populated places in Atsimo-Andrefana